In law enforcement jargon, a suspect is a known person accused or suspected of committing a crime. Police and reporters in the United States often use the word suspect as a jargon when referring to the perpetrator of the offense (perp in dated U.S. slang). However, in official definition, the perpetrator is the robber, assailant, counterfeiter, etc.—the person who committed the crime. The distinction between suspect and perpetrator recognizes that the suspect is not known to have committed the offense, while the perpetrator—who may not yet have been suspected of the crime, and is thus not necessarily a suspect—is the one who did. The suspect may be a different person from the perpetrator, or there may have been no actual crime, which would mean there is no perpetrator.

A common error in police reports is a witness description of the suspect (as a witness generally describes a perpetrator, while a mug shot is of  a suspect). Frequently it is stated that police are looking for the suspect, when there is no suspect; the police could be looking for a suspect, but they are surely looking for the perpetrator, and very often it is impossible to tell from such a police report whether there is a suspect or not.

Possibly because of the misuse of "suspect" to mean "perpetrator", police in the late 20th and early 21st century began to use person of interest, possible suspect, and even possible person of interest,  to mean suspect.

Under the judicial systems of the U.S., once a decision is approved to arrest a suspect, or bind him over for trial, either by a prosecutor issuing an information, a grand jury issuing a true bill or indictment, or a judge issuing an arrest warrant, the suspect can then be properly called a defendant, or the accused. Only after being convicted is the suspect properly called the perpetrator.

See also 
 Arguido
 Criminal
 Perp walk

References
Suspect Suspicious and Suspect.

Law enforcement terminology
Criminals by status